The All That Echoes World Tour is the fifth concert tour by American recording artist, Josh Groban. Promoting his sixth studio album, All That Echoes, the tour performed over 60 shows in Australasia, Europe and North America.

Background
The tour was announced on February 2, 2013 via Groban's official website. Initially showing four shows in Australia, the announcement tied into Groban's first concert film. Titled, Josh Groban Live: All That Echoes, the film debuted in select theaters (in the U.S.) on February 4, 2013. The show was filmed at the Allen Room, located within the Lincoln Center for the Performing Arts, in New York City. The film was later shown as a PBS special hosted by Audra McDonald, airing April 12, 2013. The film's distributor, Fathom Events, re-released the film on July 16, 2013 as a part of its "Artist's Cut" series.

For the first North American leg, Groban performed alongside several symphony orchestras. Deemed the All That Echoes Symphony Tour, the singer visited numerous amphitheaters during the summer of 2013. In May 2013, Groban announced his second North American leg. Here, the singer would play arenas in the U.S. and Canada in the round. The In the Round Tour was the first for the performer in his touring career. He explained wanting to take the intimacy of a theater and translate it into an arena setting. He went on to say: "It has been a vision of mine to do a tour in the round for a while now, it was just a matter of when was the right time. I have always had moments during the show where I walked through the crowd and interacted with the fans. I felt that now was the time to bring it all together. I can't wait to bring music from throughout my career, great fun and new experiences to my fans".

Orchestras
For the shows from July to August, known as the "All That Echoes Symphony Tour", Groban performed each show with a local symphony orchestra.
July 2, 3, 4–Los Angeles–Los Angeles Philharmonic
July 7–Morrison–Colorado Symphony Orchestra
July 24–Rohnert Park–Santa Rosa Symphony
August 10–Highland Park–Ravinia Festival Orchestra
August 12–Interlochen–Traverse Symphony Orchestra
August 13–Kettering–Dayton Philharmonic Orchestra
August 16–Vienna–National Symphony Orchestra
August 18–Atlanta–Atlanta Symphony Orchestra
August 22–Canandaigua–Rochester Philharmonic Orchestra

Opening acts
Judith Hill (North America—Leg 3)
Dina Garipova (Moscow)

Setlist
{{hidden
| headercss = background: #ccccff; font-size: 100%; width: 65%;
| contentcss = text-align: left; font-size: 100%; width: 75%;
| header =April 23, 2013—Melbourne, Australia—Palais Theatre
| content =
"Brave"
"You Are Loved (Don't Give Up)"
"February Song"
"Aléjate"
"Happy in My Heartache"
"Alla Luce del Sole"
"The Moon Is a Harsh Mistress"
"Sincera"
"Hollow Talk"
"Untitled I" (Instrumental Interlude)
"Você Existe Em Mim"
"Falling Slowly"
"Vincent"
"To Where You Are"
"Machine"
"I Believe (When I Fall in Love It Will Be Forever)"
Encore
"Awake"
"You Raise Me Up"
}}

{{hidden
| headercss = background: #ccccff; font-size: 100%; width: 65%;
| contentcss = text-align: left; font-size: 100%; width: 75%;
| header =October 16, 2013—Kansas City, Missouri—Sprint Center
| content =
"Untitled I" (Instrumental Introduction, contained elements of "All'improvviso Amore")
"Brave"
"False Alarms"
"February Song"
"Un alma más"
"Vincent"
"Alla Luce del Sole"
"The Moon Is a Harsh Mistress"
"Sincera"
"Remember When It Rained" (performed with Judith Hill)
"Dream On" (performed by Christian Hebel)
"Untitled II" (Instrumental Interlude)
"Você Existe Em Mim"
"To Where You Are"
"She Moved Through the Fair"
"The Prayer" (performed with Judith Hill)
"I Believe (When I Fall in Love It Will Be Forever)" (performed with Kantorei Kansas City)
Encore
"You Raise Me Up"
}}

Tour dates

Cancellations and rescheduled shows

Box office score data

Critical reception
The tour was well received amongst spectators and critics. In New Zealand, Stacey Hunt (Yahoo! New Zealand) gave the show at the Vector Arena five out of five stars. She writes "With the audience seemingly in high spirits it was a great note to end on and the whoops and cheers from the crowd were as good an indicator as any as to how much the show was enjoyed. I was pleasantly surprised by how much I did enjoy it. It was two hours of great music and comic genius and a night I would recommend to both fans and non-fans alike". The good press continued for show in Perth. Lucy Gibson (The West Australian) stated "Indeed, Groban's is a voice that delights and he hit all the right notes with a diverse repertoire that included Don McLean's much- covered ballad, "Vincent', Glen Hansard's exquisite Oscar-winning song 'Falling Slowly', and Jimmy Webb's 'The Moon is a Harsh Mistress'".

For the show in Melbourne at the Palais Theatre, Ching Pei Khoo (The Music) stated Groban showed a great combination of vocals and stage presence. He continues, "He balances the gravity and sombreness of his tenor's voice by constantly peppering genial conviviality and rapid banter in between tracks, whether he is encouraging a fan to toss one cent coins at him on stage or comparing the cuddliness of his buffed guitarist Tariqh Akoni with that of a koala he’d held in Perth". Good reviews continued as the tour reach stateside. 
Jennifer Durrant (Daily Herald) wrote the concert in Salt Lake City was on her musical bucket list. She continued, "Garnering repeated standing ovations, Groban performed two encore songs—'You Raise Me Up' and the Charlie Chaplin song 'Smile'—songs perfectly descriptive of the mood of the thousands of concertgoers as they left the arena singing and humming their favorite tunes of the night".

John Serba (mLive) called the concert at the Van Andel Arena, "a greeting card come to life". He went on to say, "There's a distinctly polished, accomplished adult-contemporary tone to The Grobester's music that makes it feel processed and safe. Few risks are taken. If it was performed by anyone else, it might be suffocating. Emotionally, he stops short of the watery melodrama of Sarah McLachlan; he's several hair tosses away from Yanni-style cheeze. He follows the tradition of Barry Manilow and Neil Diamond, the bearers of bathos, but he bears the easy charisma of a grounded 21st-century personality not concerned with pop stardom". For the final show in Dallas, Hunter Hauk (The Dallas Morning News) called the show a "victory lap to the finish line". He goes on to say, "While an in-the-round setup might be awkward for performers who hog the spotlight, Groban seemed happy to let his trumpet player, violinist and guitarists share in the crowd's love on the outer catwalk. When the production called for extra arena drama, starry lighting displays and other elegant set embellishments were lowered on command".

Band
Bass: Andre Manga
Keyboards: Ruslan Sirota
Percussion: Pete Korpela
Guitar: Tariqh Akoni
Drums: Dave DiCenso
Violin: Christian Hebel
Trumpet: Daniel Rosenboom
Source:

External links
Groban's Official Website
Groban's Official Facebook Page
Groban's Official YouTube Page
Groban's Official Myspace Page

References

2013 concert tours
Josh Groban concert tours